The Big Khan Mosque is located in Bakhchisaray, Crimea, and is part of the Bakhchisaray Palace. It is one of the largest mosques in the Crimea and one of the first buildings of the Khan's palace. The mosque was built in 1532 by Sahib I Giray and bore his name in the 17th century.

History 
The mosque consists of a three-aisle square prayer hall covered with a hipped roof, a narthex and porticos facing east and west. Two symmetrical octagonal minarets rise through the porticos; they are twenty-eight meters high and have conical caps and finials. A domed wudu kiosk of square shape is attached to the northeastern corner of the mosque. It is believed that a madrasah built by Khan Arslan Giray in 1750 used to adjoin the eastern wall. The mosque is entered from a portal facing north. Inside, a balcony is attached to three of the four walls, part of which is sectioned off for the Khan's lodge. Scholars argue that the mosque was originally roofed with domes of various sizes.

In 1736 the mosque was damaged by fire and later restored during the reign of Khan Selameta Giray.

See also
 Religion in Crimea
List of mosques in Europe

References 

Mosques in Bakhchysarai
Religious buildings and structures completed in 1532
16th-century mosques
1532 establishments in Europe
Cultural heritage monuments of federal significance in Crimea